The 2014–15 Harvard Crimson men's basketball team represented Harvard University during the 2014–15 NCAA Division I men's basketball season. The Crimson, led by eighth year head coach Tommy Amaker, played their home games at Lavietes Pavilion and were members of the Ivy League. They finished the season 22–8, 11–3 in Ivy League play to share to the regular season Ivy League title with Yale. They earned the Ivy League's automatic bid to the NCAA tournament after defeating Yale in a One-game playoff, the ninth one-game playoff tie breaker in Ivy League history. In the NCAA Tournament, the Crimson lost to North Carolina in the second round.

Recruits

Class of 2014

Class of 2015

Roster

Preseason
Harvard was again the unanimous preseason top team in the Ivy League media poll. The team entered the season ranked 25th in the AP Poll.

Schedule
In the penultimate game of the regular season on March 6, the team lost to Yale, falling behind them by a game in the standings with one game to play. However, the teams finished the season tied for the Ivy League title and Harvard won the one-game playoff on March 14 to earn the conference's automatic bid to the NCAA tournament. The 2014–15 team was the first Ivy League team to make a fifth consecutive postseason appearance since the 2001–02 Princeton Tigers men's basketball team completed a seven-year run for Princeton. They were the third Ivy team to make four consecutive  NCAA basketball tournament appearances, a feat last accomplished by the 1991–92 Princeton Tigers men's basketball team. On March 19 in the 2015 NCAA tournament the team overcame a 16-point second half deficit against fourth-seeded North Carolina to take the lead before surrendering it in the final minute of play.

|-
!colspan=9 style="background:#991111; color:#FFFFFF;"| Regular season

|-
!colspan=9 style="background:#991111; color:#FFFFFF;"| Ivy League one game playoff

|-
!colspan=9 style="background:#991111; color:#FFFFFF;"| NCAA tournament

Source:

Honors
Wesley Saunders was First Team All-Ivy selection, while Siyani Chambers and Steve Moundou-Missi were second team selections. Moundou-Missi was the Conference Defensive Player of the Year. Saunders joined Don Flemming as the only players to have earned three consecutive first team all-league selections. Saunders was a 2014–15 Men's All-District I Team selection by the  U.S. Basketball Writers Association.

Rankings

References

Harvard Crimson men's basketball seasons
Harvard
Harvard
Harvard Crimson men's basketball
Harvard Crimson men's basketball
Harvard Crimson men's basketball
Harvard Crimson men's basketball